The 1992 Mercedes Cup,  was a men's tennis tournament played on outdoor clay courts and held at the Tennis Club Weissenhof in Stuttgart, Germany that was part of the Championship Series of the 1992 ATP Tour. It was the 15th edition of the tournament was held from 13 July until 19 July 1992. Unseeded qualifier Andrei Medvedev won the singles title.

Finals

Singles
 Andrei Medvedev defeated  Wayne Ferreira, 6–1, 6–4, 6–7(5–7), 2–6, 6–1
 It was Medvedev's 2nd singles title of the year and of his career.

Doubles
 Glenn Layendecker /  Byron Talbot defeated  Marc Rosset /  Javier Sánchez, 6–3, 7–6

References

External links
 Official website 
 ITF tournament edition details
 ATP tournament profile

Stuttgart Open
Stuttgart Open
1992 in German tennis
Mercedes Cup